The Battle of Stamford Bridge took place at the village of Stamford Bridge, East Riding of Yorkshire, in England, on 25 September 1066, between an English army under King Harold Godwinson and an invading Norwegian force led by King Harald Hardrada and the English king's brother Tostig Godwinson. After a bloody battle, both Hardrada and Tostig, along with most of the Norwegians, were killed. Although Harold Godwinson repelled the Norwegian invaders, his army was defeated by the Normans at Hastings less than three weeks later. The battle has traditionally been presented as symbolising the end of the Viking Age, although major Scandinavian campaigns in Britain and Ireland occurred in the following decades, such as those of King Sweyn Estrithson of Denmark in 1069–1070 and King Magnus Barefoot of Norway in 1098 and 1102–1103.

Background
The death of King Edward the Confessor of England in January 1066 had triggered a succession struggle in which a variety of contenders from across north-western Europe fought for the English throne. These claimants included the King of Norway, Harald Hardrada. According to the Anglo-Saxon Chronicle Manuscript D (p. 197), the Norwegians assembled a fleet of 300 ships to invade England. The authors, however, did not seem to differentiate between warships and supply ships. In King Harald's Saga, Snorri Sturluson states, "it is said that King Harald had over two hundred ships, apart from supply ships and smaller craft". Combined with reinforcements picked up in Orkney, the Norwegian army most likely numbered between 7,000 and 9,000 men. Arriving off the English coast in September Hardrada was joined by further forces recruited in Flanders and Scotland by Tostig Godwinson. Tostig was at odds with his elder brother Harold (who had been elected king by the Witenagemot on the death of Edward). Having been ousted from his position as Earl of Northumbria and exiled in 1065, Tostig had mounted a series of abortive attacks on England in the spring of 1066.

In the late summer of 1066, the invaders sailed up the Ouse before advancing on York. On 20 September they defeated a northern English army led by Edwin, Earl of Mercia, and his brother Morcar, Earl of Northumbria, at the Battle of Fulford, outside York. Following this victory they received the surrender of York. Having briefly occupied the city and taken hostages and supplies from the city they returned towards their ships at Riccall. They offered peace to the Northumbrians in exchange for their support for Hardrada's bid for the throne, and demanded further hostages from the whole of Yorkshire.

At this time King Harold was in Southern England, anticipating an invasion from France by William, Duke of Normandy, another contender for the English throne. Learning of the Norwegian invasion he headed north at great speed with his huscarls and as many thegns as he could gather, travelling day and night. Having learned that the Northumbrians had been ordered to send the additional hostages and supplies to the Norwegians at Stamford Bridge, Harold hurried on through York to attack them at this rendezvous on 25 September. Until the English army came into view the invaders remained unaware of the presence of a hostile army anywhere in the vicinity.

Location

Manuscripts C, D and E of the Anglo-Saxon Chronicle all mention Stamford Bridge by name. Manuscript C contains a passage which states "... came upon them beyond the bridge ....". Henry of Huntington mentions Stamford Bridge and describes part of the battle being fought across the bridge.

The exact location of the battle site is not known for certain. Sources indicate that it took place along the Derwent River, where a wooden bridge crossed the water. There are indications of a meadow on the west side of the river and higher ground on the eastern side. The original bridge no longer exists, and no archaeological traces of it remain. The traditional locating of part of the battle at Battle Flats is based on no contemporary references. Statements that in the 18th-century skeletons and weapons were found there have not been corroborated by modern finds.

Battle

According to Snorri Sturluson, before the battle a single man rode up alone to Harald Hardrada and Tostig. He gave no name, but spoke to Tostig, offering the return of his earldom if he would turn against Hardrada. Tostig asked what his brother Harold would be willing to give Hardrada for his trouble. The rider replied "Seven feet of English ground, as he is taller than other men" (implies that both Hardrada and his army will be killed and buried on English soil). Then he rode back to the Saxon host. Hardrada was impressed by the rider's boldness, and asked Tostig who he was. Tostig replied that the rider was Harold Godwinson himself. According to Henry of Huntingdon, Harold said "Six feet of ground or as much more as he needs, as he is taller than most men."

The sudden appearance of the English army caught the Norwegians by surprise.  The English advance was then delayed by the need to pass through the choke-point presented by the bridge itself. The Anglo-Saxon Chronicle has it that a giant Norse axeman (possibly armed with a Dane Axe) blocked the narrow crossing and single-handedly held up the entire English army. The story is that this axeman cut down up to 40 Englishmen and was defeated only when an English soldier floated under the bridge in a half-barrel and thrust his spear through the planks in the bridge, mortally wounding the axeman.

This delay had allowed the bulk of the Norse army to form a shieldwall to face the English attack. Harold's army poured across the bridge, forming a line just short of the Norse army, locked shields and charged. The battle went far beyond the bridge itself, and although it raged for hours, the Norse army's decision to leave their armour behind left them at a distinct disadvantage. Eventually, the Norse army began to fragment and fracture, allowing the English troops to force their way in and break up the Scandinavians' shield wall. Completely outflanked, and with Hardrada killed with an arrow to his windpipe and Tostig slain, the Norwegian army disintegrated and was virtually annihilated.

In the later stages of the battle, the Norwegians were reinforced by troops who had been guarding the ships at Riccall, led by Eystein Orre, Hardrada's prospective son-in-law. Some of his men were said to have collapsed and died of exhaustion upon reaching the battlefield. The remainder were fully armed for battle.  Their counter-attack, described in the Norwegian tradition as "Orre's Storm", briefly checked the English advance, but was soon overwhelmed and Orre was slain. The Norwegian army were routed. As given in the Chronicles, pursued by the English army, some of the fleeing Norsemen drowned whilst crossing rivers.

So many died in an area so small that the field was said to have been still whitened with bleached bones 50 years after the battle.

Aftermath

King Harold accepted a truce with the surviving Norwegians, including Harald's son Olaf and Paul Thorfinnsson, Earl of Orkney. They were allowed to leave after giving pledges not to attack England again. The losses the Norwegians had suffered were so severe that only 24 ships from the fleet of over 300 were needed to carry the survivors away. They withdrew to Orkney, where they spent the winter, and in the spring Olaf returned to Norway. The kingdom was then divided and shared between him and his brother Magnus, whom Harald had left behind to govern in his absence. The casualties are referred as so high in both sides in many sources. An English-born Norman historian Orderik Vital reports half a century later that the whaling ground is still "is easily recognizable by the piles of bones that still bear witness to the heavy losses on both sides". Which proves this.

Harold's victory was short-lived.  Three days after the battle, on 28 September, a second invasion army led by William, Duke of Normandy, landed in Pevensey Bay, Sussex, on the south coast of England. Harold had to immediately turn his troops around and force-march them southwards to intercept the Norman army. Less than three weeks after Stamford Bridge, on 14 October 1066, the English army was decisively defeated and King Harold II fell in action at the Battle of Hastings, beginning the Norman conquest of England, a process facilitated by the heavy losses amongst the English military commanders.

Monuments
 
Two monuments to the battle have been erected in and around the village of Stamford Bridge.

Village monument
The first memorial is located in the village on Main Street (A116). The monument's inscription reads (in both English and Norwegian):

THE BATTLE OF STAMFORD BRIDGE
WAS FOUGHT IN THIS NEIGHBOURHOOD
ON SEPTEMBER 25TH, 1066

The inscription on the accompanying marble tablet reads:
THE BATTLE OF STAMFORD BRIDGE
KING HAROLD OF ENGLAND DEFEATED
HIS BROTHER TOSTIG AND KING
HARDRAADA OF NORWAY HERE ON
25 SEPTEMBER 1066

Battlefield monument
A second monument is located at the battlefield site, at the end of Whiterose Drive. It has memorial stone and plaque that shows the events and the outcome of the battle.

References

External links
 The Battle of Stamford Bridge by Michael C. Blundell
 Description of battle by Geoff Boxell
 The Battle of Stamford Bridge
 Saga of Harald Hardrade
 The Battle of Stamford Bridge, BBC "In Our Time" 2 June 2011
 Old Norse description of the battle, with translation

1066 in England
Battles involving England
Battles involving Norway
Battles involving the Anglo-Saxons
Battles involving the Vikings
Last stands
Battles involving Yorkshire
Conflicts in 1066
History of the East Riding of Yorkshire
History of York
Registered historic battlefields in England
Stamford Bridge